Freeman C. Thompson (February 25, 1845 - August 10, 1887) was a Union Army officer in the American Civil War who was awarded the Medal of Honor for his actions at the Third Battle of Petersburg on 2 April, 1865. He fought for the 116th Ohio Infantry. Thompson was born in Monroe County, Ohio and is now buried in Olive Cemetery (Caldwell, Ohio).

Medal of Honor Citation 
Was twice knocked from the parapet of Fort Gregg by blows from the enemy muskets but at the third attempt fought his way into the works.

Date Issued: 12, May, 1865

References 

1845 births
1887 deaths
American Civil War recipients of the Medal of Honor
United States Army Medal of Honor recipients
German-born Medal of Honor recipients
Ohio in the American Civil War